Edward Robinson  (17 June 1838 – 2 October 1896) was an English recipient of the Victoria Cross, the highest and most prestigious award for gallantry in the face of the enemy that can be awarded to British and Commonwealth forces.

Details
Robinson was 19 years old, and an able seaman in the Royal Navy, serving in the Naval Brigade from HMS Shannon during the Indian Mutiny when the following deed took place for which he was awarded the VC:

The medal
His Victoria Cross is displayed at the National Maritime Museum in Greenwich, London.

References

Monuments to Courage (David Harvey, 1999)
The Register of the Victoria Cross (This England, 1997)
Scotland's Forgotten Valour (Graham Ross, 1995)

External links
Location of grave and VC medal (Berkshire)
News Item (ceremonial unveiling and dedication of a memorial)

1838 births
1896 deaths
Royal Navy sailors
British recipients of the Victoria Cross
Indian Rebellion of 1857 recipients of the Victoria Cross
Royal Navy recipients of the Victoria Cross
People from Portsea, Portsmouth
Military personnel from Portsmouth
Burials in Berkshire